Bruno De Zordo (18 November 1941 – 25 June 2004) was an Italian ski jumper. He competed in the normal hill event at the 1964 Winter Olympics.

References

External links
 

1941 births
2004 deaths
Italian male ski jumpers
Olympic ski jumpers of Italy
Ski jumpers at the 1964 Winter Olympics
Sportspeople from the Province of Belluno